South Salina Street Downtown Historic District is a historic district representing what was the commercial core of in Syracuse, New York from the mid-nineteenth century to the mid-twentieth century.  It was listed on the National Register of Historic Places on October 16, 2009.  The vacancy rate in the district is high, and some buildings need extensive rehabilitation.  Recent revitalization plans served as impetus for seeking listing on the National Register of Historic Places.

Originally it included the east side of the 200 block of South Salina Street, the entire 300 block and one building in the 400 block. This area had 22 contributing buildings and 3 non-contributing buildings.  Among the contributing properties are two the White Memorial Building and the Loew's State Theater, also individually listed on the National Register of Historic Places. In 2014 its boundaries were increased to include some more side streets.

Architects represented in the district include Horatio Nelson White, Archimedes Russell, Charles E. Colton, Joseph Lyman Silsbee, Charles D. Wilsey and Thomas W. Lamb.

See also 
South Salina Street Historic District, also NRHP-listed, further down the same street
 National Register of Historic Places listings in Syracuse, New York

References

Historic districts on the National Register of Historic Places in New York (state)
Buildings and structures in Syracuse, New York
Historic districts in Onondaga County, New York
National Register of Historic Places in Syracuse, New York